Gerald Ashburner France  (4 August 1870 – 11 February 1935) was a British businessman and importer and Liberal Party politician.

Family and education
Gerald Ashburner France was the son of James Ashburner France of Tynemouth and was rooted in the commercial and social life of the North East of England. His home was at Newbiggin Hall, Westerhope in Newcastle upon Tyne. In religion, France was a Methodist and he was educated at Rydal, a boarding school in North Wales founded in the Methodist tradition. In 1898, he married Hilda Bainbridge from Eshott in Northumberland. They had four sons and a daughter.

Career
France had a business career as an agent and importer in the North East. He rose to become governing director of the firm J A France & Co. of London and Newcastle as well as Chairman of Scott & Turner Ltd, a firm of Newcastle tinprinters. During the First World War, France served as a temporary lieutenant in the Royal Naval Volunteer Reserve.

Politics

Local politics
France became a member of Northumberland County Council in 1903, representing the coal mining area of Prudhoe and was made an Alderman in 1913. He was sometime chairman of the old age pensions committee of the county of Northumberland and also served as chairman of the county's Parliamentary Committee and of its Health Establishment Committee.

Parliament
France had Parliamentary ambitions. His name was mentioned as a possible Liberal candidate for the seat of Gateshead in 1909 to succeed the Lib-Lab MP, John Johnson but although he was not chosen he was soon selected elsewhere. He entered Parliament at the January 1910 general election when he held the Liberal seat of Morley in the West Riding of Yorkshire by a majority of 4,631 votes over the Unionist in a three-cornered contest. France held his seat at the December 1910 general election when he was returned unopposed.

The Morley constituency was abolished for the 1918 general election and France was adopted as Liberal candidate for the new seat of Batley and Morley. He fought the seat as a Coalition Liberal (as Lieutenant Gerald France) and was not opposed by a Conservative or Independent Liberal. He was presumably awarded the Coalition coupon and in a straight with Labour candidate Ben Turner, France took the seat by a majority of 1,468 votes.

France may have seen the political writing on the wall as he did not defend his seat at the 1922 general election when Batley and Morley fell to Ben Turner for Labour.  He did not stand for Parliament again.

Electoral record

Political appointments
In 1916, France was appointed as Parliamentary Private Secretary to the President of the Board of Trade, Walter Runciman. He was made a Deputy Lieutenant of Northumberland in August 1932  He was also sometime President of the Gladstone Club.

Other public appointments
France was sometime President of the National Commercial Temperance League, a body formed in the 1890s to appeal to the business and professional community in the economic and ethical field of thought to promote temperance. He was also a member of the national executive committee of the Boys' Brigade.

Death
Towards the end of his political career, France's health began to deteriorate. Just before Christmas of 1934, he went to Tenerife on doctors' advice for the benefit of his condition. Back in England in the new year, he was taken to hospital in Newcastle upon Tyne on 21 January where he was kept until he died on 11 February.

References

1870 births
1935 deaths
Liberal Party (UK) MPs for English constituencies
UK MPs 1910–1918
UK MPs 1918–1922
Royal Naval Volunteer Reserve personnel of World War I